The women's 200 metre butterfly event at the 2000 Summer Olympics took place on 19–20 September at the Sydney International Aquatic Centre in Sydney, Australia.

U.S. swimmer Misty Hyman stunned Australia's defending champion Susie O'Neill to claim the Olympic title in front of a raucous home crowd. Seen as almost a lock victory for O'Neill, Hyman seized off a powerful lead and held a full body length over the champion at the 150-metre turn to maintain her relentless pace and touch the wall first in one of the oldest Olympic records in the book. She improved a sterling lifetime best of 2:05.88 to erase Mary T. Meagher's 1984 record by 1.02 seconds, but her time was just a 0.07-margin closer to O'Neill's world record. In a signature race, O'Neill ended up with only a silver in 2:06.58, adding it to her gold from Atlanta in 1996 and bronze from Barcelona in 1992. Meanwhile, Petria Thomas took home the bronze in 2:07.12, handing the entire medal lock for the Aussies with a two–three finish.

Danish star Mette Jacobsen, competing in her fourth Olympics, finished off the podium by over a second in 2:08.24, while Poland's Otylia Jędrzejczak posted a fifth-place time of 2:08.48. Racing next to her teammate Hyman in lane seven, Kaitlin Sandeno picked up a sixth spot with a time of 2:08.81. Japanese duo Yuko Nakanishi (2:09.66) and Maki Mita (2:10.72) closed out the field.

Records
Prior to this competition, the existing world and Olympic records were as follows.

The following new world and Olympic records were set during this competition.

Results

Heats

Semifinals

Semifinal 1

Semifinal 2

Final

* Also an American record.

References

External links
Official Olympic Report

B
2000 in women's swimming
Women's events at the 2000 Summer Olympics